Defending champions Barbora Krejčíková and Kateřina Siniaková defeated Shuko Aoyama and Ena Shibahara in the final, 6–4, 6–3 to win the women's doubles tennis title at the 2023 Australian Open. It was their second Australian Open title and seventh major title together, and they extended their winning streak at the majors to 24 matches with the win, dating back to the 2022 Australian Open. 

Siniaková retained the WTA No. 1 doubles ranking by reaching the final. Coco Gauff, Veronika Kudermetova, Elise Mertens, Gabriela Dabrowski, Lyudmyla Kichenok, Yang Zhaoxuan, Kristina Mladenovic, Desirae Krawczyk and Demi Schuurs were also vying for the top ranking, but were eliminated from contention during the course of the competition.

This tournament marked the final major appearance of former doubles world No. 1 and three-time women's doubles major champion Sania Mirza. Partnering Anna Danilina, she was defeated in the second round.

Seeds

Draw

Finals

Top half

Section 1

Section 2

Bottom half

Section 3

Section 4

Other entry information

Wild cards

Protected ranking

Alternates

Withdrawals

References

External links 
 Draw

Women's Doubles
Australian Open - Women's Doubles
2023